Acacia cyclops, commonly known as coastal wattle, cyclops wattle, one-eyed wattle, red-eyed wattle, redwreath acacia, western coastal wattle, rooikrans, rooikrans acacia, is a coastal shrub or small tree in the family Fabaceae.  Native to Australia, it is distributed along the west coast of Western Australia as far north as Leeman, and along the south coast into South Australia. The Noongar peoples of Western Australia know the plant as wilyawa or woolya wah.

Description
It is found in locations exposed to coastal winds, red-eyed wattle grows as a dense, dome shaped shrub; this helps protect against salt spray, sand-blast and erosion of soil at the roots. Like many other Acacia species, red-eyed wattle has phyllodes rather than true leaves. The phyllodes range from four to eight centimetres long, and from six to twelve millimetres wide. Its flower heads are bright yellow spherical clusters. Very few flower heads are produced at a time, but flowering occurs over a long period, from early spring to late summer, between September and May. This is unusual for Acacia species, which normally flower in one brief but impressive display.

Both the common and species names refer to the appearance of the pods when first open in late spring: each shiny black seed is encircled by a thick orange-red stalk, resembling a bloodshot eye.

Red-eyed wattle can be used to help stabilise coastal sands.  It was introduced into Africa for this purpose, but it has spread rapidly and is now a serious pest in southern Africa, where it is known as rooikrans (in Afrikaans, "red garland") .  The introduction of the gall-forming cecidomyiid Dasineura dielsi as a biological control has had only limited success in the effective control of this weed.

The green seed pods may be used as a natural soap, by crushing them and using the pods with water to wash with.

Taxonomy
The species was first formally described by the botanist George Don in 1832 in the work A General History of Dichlamydeous Plants. It was reclassified as Racosperma eglandulosum in 2003 by Leslie Pedley and transferred back to the genus Acacia in 2006. Many synonyms of the species are known including Acacia cyclopis, Acacia mirbeli and Acacia eglandulosa.

It is thought to be related to Acacia redolens and is quite similar to Acacia veronica. It is about as drought tolerant as Acacia saligna but also able to tolerate sea spray.

The specific epithet is taken from the large black seed which is enclosed in bright red tissue.

Distribution
It is found along coastal areas in the Mid West, Wheatbelt, Peel, South West, Great Southern and Goldfields-Esperance region of Western Australia from Geraldton in the north, to Augusta in the south and east to the South Australian border. It is found in limestone areas and on and around sand dunes growing in sandy soils. In South Australia it is also found to have a discontinuous distribution from the border eastwards to around Yorketown and Yorke Peninsula and on Kangaroo Island. It is often part of coastal heath or scrubland communities in sandy or loamy soils.

A. cyclops has invaded similar habitat in other areas within Australia, mostly semi-arid  regions of inland south-eastern South Australia where it is considered a problem. It is also found in parts of South Africa along roadsides and waterways as well as parts of California in wetland habitats and among riparian communities.

In South Africa it is considered to be one of the most widespread alien invasive species, though the roots are susceptible to attack by various species of Ganoderma fungi. A. cyclops is problematic in coastal and lowland parts of the Cape Provinces.

Uses
Indigenous Australians grind the seeds into a flour to make damper, the seeds are a good source of carbohydrates, fats and protein. The seeds pods are also crushed while still green to make an insect repellent and sunscreen that is also used to treat eczema.  The pods can also be used to make a soap solution. The edible gum exuded from the trunk can be used as chewing gum or to make a glue. The wood is used to make a variety of tools and the rotten wood is a good source of witchetty grubs.

See also
 List of Acacia species
 Invasive plants of Australian origin

References

Further reading

 

cyclops
Endemic flora of Australia
Flora of South Australia
Fabales of Australia
Acacias of Western Australia
Taxa named by George Don
Plants described in 1832
Taxa named by Allan Cunningham (botanist)